Elizabeth Lago Netto (June 24, 1955 – September 13, 2015) was a Brazilian actress and model.

Lago was born in Rio de Janeiro.  She was married to singer and actor Eduardo Conde for many years.

In 2012, Lago was diagnosed with gallbladder cancer, which spread into her liver. She died from the disease at the age of 60 on September 13, 2015.

Filmography

Film
1976: Dona Flor e seus dois maridos .... Zizi
1997: Alô? .... Dora
2002: Xuxa e os duendes 2 - No caminho das fadas .... Algaz
2005: Mais uma Vez Amor .... Mendonça
2007: Xuxa em Sonho de Menina .... Pandora Raquel

Television
1992: Anos Rebeldes .... Natália
1993: Sex Appeal .... Vicky
1994: Quatro por Quatro .... Abigail
1996: Vira-Lata .... Walkíria
1997: O Amor Está no Ar .... Sofia
1998: Pecado Capital ....  Mila
2000: Uga-Uga .... Brigitte
2002: O Quinto dos Infernos .... Carlota Joaquina de Bourbon e Bragança
2004: Kubanacan .... Mercedes
2006: Bang Bang .... Calamity Jane
2006: A Diarista .... Leda
2006: Pé na Jaca .... Morgana Botelho Bulhões
2006: A Diarista .... Leda (Special guest)
2007: Duas Caras .... Soraya
2009: Caminho das Índias .... Herself (Special guest)
2009: Cinquentinha .... Rejane Batista
2011: Vidas em Jogo .... Marizete Bastos da Silva
2013: Pecado Mortal .... Stella Nolasco (final appearance)

References

External links
 

1955 births
2015 deaths
Brazilian film actresses
Brazilian female models
Brazilian telenovela actresses
Deaths from cancer in Rio de Janeiro (state)
Deaths from gallbladder cancer